Tsuwano Castle was a mid-size castle, now ruins, in Tsuwano, Shimane Prefecture, Japan.

History 
The castle was established by Yoshimi Yoriyuki, and it was initially called Sanbonmatsu-jo. Its first purpose was to watch over the province of Iwami. The Yoriyuki family ruled there for 14 generations. The 14th generation lord of the castle, Yoshimi Hironaga, supported the Mouri clan in the Battle of Sekigahara (1600) and was moved to Hagi with them after they lost to the Tokugawa forces.

Following the Battle of Sekigahara, Sakazaki Naomori was awarded this domain for his support of the Tokugawa in the battle. He vastly expanded the castle. The stone walls at the top of the mountain date from this period. Naomori died in 1616, leaving no descendants. Kamei Masanori was moved here in his place, and his family ruled as lords of the castle for 11 generations. The tenshu burned down in a fire caused by lightning in 1686. With the coming of the Meiji Period, like many castles in Japan, it was dismantled in 1873.

Current site 
The Tsuwano Castle site now largely has only stone walls left, though they are extensive. The site has horikiri trenches and some small baileys. Bears are known to live in the ruins, and visitors carry bear bells to scare them off. There are a few buildings left over, including the Babasaki Yagura and the Monomi Yagura.

Further reading

References 

Former castles in Japan
Castles in Shimane Prefecture
Ōuchi clan